Pali (पाली) is one of the wards of Panini Rural Municipality, Arghakhanchi District. It lies in the western part of the municipality. It is surrounded by other wards as:
Chidika,Khidim  in the East
 Adguri in the West
 Maidan in the South
 Balkot, Kerunga in the North
 Sandhikarkha Municipality in the North West
पाली वडा कार्यालयः

पाली वडाको वेवसाइटमा जान यहाँ क्लिक गर्नुहोस।

वडाध्यक्षः

रोम बहादुर पाण्डे

Populated places in Arghakhanchi District